The Central District of Ramshir County is a district (bakhsh) in Ramshir County, Khuzestan Province, Iran. At the 2006 census, its population was 36,022, in 6,530 families.  The district has one city: Ramshir.  The district has two rural districts (dehestan): Abdoliyeh-ye Gharbi Rural District and Abdoliyeh-ye Sharqi Rural District.

References 

Ramshir County
Districts of Khuzestan Province